Ecsenius portenoyi is a species of combtooth blenny in the genus Ecsenius. It is found in the western central Pacific ocean. It can reach a maximum length of 4.5 centimetres. Blennies in this species feed primarily off of plants, including benthic algae and weeds. Its specific name honours Norman S. Portenoy of Bethesda, Maryland for his support of the ichthyological expeditions of the National Museum of Natural History.

References
 Springer, V. G. 1988 (14 Sept.) The Indo-Pacific blenniid fish genus Ecsenius. Smithsonian Contributions to Zoology No. 465: i-iv + 1–134, col. Pls. 1-14.

portenoyi
Fish described in 1988
Taxa named by Victor G. Springer